Elizabeth Moen is an American singer-songwriter from Vinton, IA based in Chicago, IL.

Biography 
Elizabeth Moen grew up in Vinton, IA and taught herself how to play guitar as a teenager. She moved to Iowa City, IA for college where she studied French and Spanish at the University of Iowa. She played her first open mic at The Mill at age 20 and wrote her first original song at age 21. Elizabeth is currently based in Chicago.

Moen self-released a self-titled EP in 2016, a debut LP That's All I Wanted in 2017 and became a staple of the Iowa City music scene. Her sophomore album A Million Miles Away, released in 2018 drew praise from regional press as well as Paste Magazine.

In 2019, her recording of a new song "Headgear" for the Tiny Desk Contest drew praise from NPR Music. Listed as "one of the entries we can't stop watching."

Moen has recorded at Hyde Street Studios in San Francisco, Fame Studios in Muscle Shoals, Alabama, Hellfire Studios in Dublin, Ireland and Flat Black Studios in Lone Tree, Iowa. (The tracks from these various recordings will all be featured on her upcoming album to be released in 2022.)

Moen was accepted into the 2020 SXSW festival as an official showcase artist and featured in NPR Music's Austin 100. Moen has also appeared in several festivals including Hinterland, Lollapalooza (official after show), Mission Creek, Mile of Music, 80/35, Lincoln Calling, and Knockan Stockan. She was also invited to perform at The Ruby Sessions in Dublin, Ireland. 
 
Moen has toured throughout the United States and Europe and supported artists such as Lake Street Dive, Margaret Glaspy, Houndmouth Ani DiFranco, St Paul and the Broken Bones, Lucy Dacus, Esme Patterson, The Weepies, Buck Meek, Hurray for the Riff Raff, Birds of Chicago, Margaret Glaspy,  William Elliott Whitmore, LP and Lissie.

In the 2020 Democratic primary, she supported Bernie Sanders and was invited to play several of the Senator's rallies in Iowa.

Elizabeth has had several songs featured in television series and movies including the following: How it Ends, Candy Jar, Elsewhere, Roswell New Mexico (CW network), Tell Me a Story (CBS), and Shameless (Showtime).

Musical style 
Moen counts Alabama Shakes, Sharon Van Etten, Stevie Nicks, Joni Mitchell among her musical influences. Her music frequently addresses mental health struggles. She is an open advocate for therapy.

Discography 

 Elizabeth Moen EP (2016)
 That's All I Wanted (2017)
 A Million Miles Away (2018)
 Creature of Habit EP (2020)

References 

Living people
21st-century American singers
Year of birth missing (living people)
Singer-songwriters from Iowa